Kazimiera Kymantaitė (June 29, 1909 – May 21, 1999) (Surname by the first marriage: Gregorauskienė, by the second marriage: Banaitienė) was a Soviet and Lithuanian stage and film actress, Lithuania's first female professional stage director.

She was born in Kuršėnai, then in Russian Empire. When she was 12 her family moved to Kaunas. She died in Vilnius and was interred in the Rasos Cemetery by the grave of her husband .

Several books were published about her.

Awards
1994: Order of the Lithuanian Grand Duke Gediminas
1957: Lithuanian SSR State Prize for her role of Kaikarienė in the play Paskenduolė ("The Drowned Woman") based on the short story of Antanas Vienuolis
 1954: People's Artist of the Lithuanian SSR
 Soviet decorations: three orders and several medals, including two Orders of the Red Banner of Labour (1950, 1954)

References

External links

1909 births
1999 deaths
20th-century Lithuanian actresses
People from Kuršėnai
Communist Party of the Soviet Union members
Officer's Crosses of the Order of the Lithuanian Grand Duke Gediminas
Recipients of the Order of the Red Banner of Labour
Lithuanian film actresses
Lithuanian stage actresses
Lithuanian theatre directors
Soviet film actresses
Soviet stage actresses
Soviet theatre directors
Burials at Rasos Cemetery